Three Women is a 1952 French film directed by André Michel. It was entered into the 1952 Cannes Film Festival.

Plot
The films consists of three segments which were adapted from three short stories by Guy de Maupassant each centered on a woman. The titles and respective lead actors of the segments are: 
 Boitelle with Moune de Rivel as the female lead character Zora, and Jacques Duby as the title character. 
 Mouche with Catherine Erard as the title character, and Marcelle Arnold, Jacques Fabbri, Pierre Olaf, Raymond Pellegrin, Marcel Mouloudji
 L'Héritage with Agnès Delahaie as Coralie, and René Lefèvre, Michel Bouquet, Pierre Palau, Bernard Noël, Jean Ozenne, Jean Mercure

Cast
 Marcelle Arnold
 Michel Bouquet as M. Lesable (segment "L'Héritage")
 Betty Daussmond
 Agnès Delahaie as Coralie Cachelin (segment "L'Héritage")
 Blanche Denège
 Moune de Rivel (fr) as Zora (segment "Boitelle")
 Jacques Duby as Antoine Boitelle
 Jacqueline Duc
 Catherine Erard as Mouche (segment "Mouche")
 Jacques Fabbri as Albert (segment "Mouche")
 Florelle
 Jacques François as Horace (segment "Mouche")
 René Lefèvre as M. Cachelin (segment "L'Héritage")
 Marcel Lupovici
 Marcel Mouloudji
 Bernard Noël as M. Maze (segment "L'Héritage")
 Pierre Olaf as P'tit bleu (segment "Mouche")
 Palau as M. Torcheboeuf (segment "L'Héritage")
 Raymond Pellegrin as Julien (segment "Mouche")
 Germaine Stainval
 Rosy Varte
 Yvonne Yma

References

External links

1952 films
1950s French-language films
French black-and-white films
Films based on works by Guy de Maupassant
Films directed by André Michel
French anthology films
Films produced by Robert Dorfmann
French comedy films
1952 comedy films
1950s French films